FREDS or Freds may refer to:

Forum for Renewable Energy Development in Scotland
Freds (paramilitary), a unit of turned insurgents supporting the British military during The Troubles